Victor Thorn (31 January 1844 – 15 September 1930) was a Luxembourg politician. He was the 11th Prime Minister of Luxembourg, serving for one year, from 24 February 1916 until 19 June 1917.

From 1885 to 1888 he was a member of the Council of State.

From 1888 to 1892 he was Director-General (Minister) for Public Works in the Eyschen Ministry.

In 1899 he became a Procureur général. In 1915 he was Minister for Justice and Public Works in the Mongenast Ministry. In 1916 the Loutsch Ministry, which had succeeded the Mongenast government, was forced to resign, having lost a confidence vote in the Chamber of Deputies.

A month later, Victor Thorn formed a new government, in which the three major parties were represented. The main problem was to resolve the supply problems in the country, which had grown more and more severe due to the war. The government rationed foodstuffs, and put a cap on prices, which, however, resulted in a black market and led to tensions between the town and rural populations. In 1917 there was a strike in the Red Lands, which was suppressed by the German army. Finally the Chamber withdrew confidence in the agriculture minister Michel Welter, and the government fell with him.

From 19 June 1917 until his death, Thorn was president of the Council of State. From 1921 to 1927 he was a permanent member of the Permanent Court of Arbitration in The Hague.

He died in 1930 in Luxembourg City.

References 
  

|-

|-

|-

|-

|-

|-

|-

Prime Ministers of Luxembourg
Ministers for Public Works of Luxembourg
Ministers for Justice of Luxembourg
Ministers for Foreign Affairs of Luxembourg
Presidents of the Council of State of Luxembourg
Members of the Chamber of Deputies (Luxembourg)
Members of the Council of State of Luxembourg
Luxembourgian people of World War I
1844 births
1930 deaths
People from Esch-sur-Alzette